"I Think I Love You" is a song by Tony Romeo, written as the debut single for fictional musical TV family the Partridge Family, released in August 1970, a month prior to the debut of the ABC-TV musical sitcom The Partridge Family starring Shirley Jones and featuring David Cassidy, both of whom appear on the record, with Cassidy as lead vocalist. The single topped Billboard's Hot 100 for three weeks in November and December 1970 and later was certified by NARM as the best-selling single of 1970.

The single also reached number one in Canada on the RPM 100 national Top Singles chart in November 1970, and in 1971 peaked at number one in Australia.

Background and release
The single, which was produced by Wes Farrell and issued on Bell Records, featured twice on the TV show during the record's seven-week climb to number one on Billboard's Hot 100. Cassidy lip-synched his performance, as he did for all songs throughout the four-year series. As with all of the Partridge Family's studio output, the single features musicians associated with iconic Los Angeles-based session players "the Wrecking Crew": Dennis Budimir, Louie Shelton, Tommy Tedesco, Joe Osborn, Max Bennett, Larry Knechtel, Mike Melvoin, and Hal Blaine. And members of overlapping studio groups the Ron Hicklin Singers and the Love Generation – brothers John and Tom Bahler (also spelled Bähler), Ron Hicklin, and Jackie Ward – feature as backing vocalists, as they do on all successive Partridge Family recordings.

Cash Box said of the song that "attractive sound side and material curries favorable attention from all types of pop programmers."

Four million copies of the single release were sold.

The Partridge Family version of the song is used prominently throughout the 2020 DreamWorks Animation film The Croods: A New Age, with a cover version by Tenacious D being performed during the film's ending credits.

Personnel
According to the AFM contract sheet, the following musicians played on the track.

Billy Strange - session leader, arrangement
Hal Blaine - drums, contractor
Dennis Budimir - guitars
Gary Coleman - percussion
Larry Knechtel - keyboards
Joe Osborn - bass guitar
Louis Shelton - guitar

Chart performance

Weekly charts

Year-end charts

All-time charts

Voice of the Beehive version

In 1991, Anglo-American alternative rock band Voice of the Beehive recorded "I Think I Love You" for their second studio album, Honey Lingers (1991). Issued through London Records, it was released as the second single from the album on September 16, 1991, and was produced by Don Was. Their version of the song peaked at number 25 on the UK Singles Chart in October 1991. The single also reached number 12 on the Australian Singles Chart in March 1992.

Track listings
7-inch and cassette single, Australasian CD single
 "I Think I Love You"
 "Something About God"

12-inch single
A1. "I Think I Love You" (Orgy mix)
A2. "Say It"
A3. "Don't Call Me Baby"
B1. "VB – Goddess of Love"

CD single
 "I Think I Love You" (7-inch)
 "I Think I Love You" (Don Was' Guilty Pleasure mix)
 "VB – Goddess of Love" (vocal mix)
 "Something About God"

Charts

References

External links
 
 

1970 debut singles
1983 singles
1991 singles
Songs written by Tony Romeo
The Partridge Family songs
Perry Como songs
Less Than Jake songs
Andy Williams songs
Voice of the Beehive songs
Billboard Hot 100 number-one singles
Cashbox number-one singles
Number-one singles in Australia
RPM Top Singles number-one singles
1970 songs
Bell Records singles
Song recordings produced by Wes Farrell
London Records singles
Song recordings produced by Don Was